Knockmoyle Sheskin also known as Knockmoyle/Sheskin or Knockmoyle and Sheskin is an intact Atlantic blanket bog, national nature reserve and Ramsar site of approximately  in County Mayo.

Features
Knockmoyle Sheskin was legally protected as a national nature reserve by the Irish government in 1986. In 1987, the site was also declared Ramsar site number 372.

The reserve is a lowland blanket bog, an intact Atlantic blanket bog, with a high density of pools which contain interesting flushes, with some forming small acidic lakes. The site has a rich flora owing to the lack of burning or grazing, with well developed cover planting. An unusual feature of the site is small areas of Betula pubescens, and Homalothecium nitens, a rare moss. Other species recorded there include black bog rush, bog cotton, deer sedge, purple moor grass, marsh saxifrage, wild angelica, and marsh arrowgrass.

References

Bogs of the Republic of Ireland
Landforms of County Mayo
Protected areas of County Mayo
Tourist attractions in County Mayo
Nature reserves in the Republic of Ireland
Protected areas established in 1986
1986 establishments in Ireland
Ramsar sites in the Republic of Ireland